Andrea Orlandi Stabilin (born 3 August 1984) is a Spanish former footballer and who played as a winger or an attacking midfielder. He currently works as a scout as well as a pundit for LaLiga TV and Spanish outlet La Media Inglesa, specialized on English football.

After playing as a youth with Alavés, he went to spend the vast majority of his professional career in the United Kingdom, starting out at Swansea City in 2007.

Club career

Spain
Born in Barcelona, Catalonia, Orlandi started his senior career with Deportivo Alavés, only managing three competitive appearances for the first team during his two-year spell, with the Basques in Segunda División. In summer 2005 he was loaned to hometown side FC Barcelona, also being almost exclusively associated with the reserves.

On 20 May 2006, as Barça were already crowned champions, Orlandi took part in his first – and only – La Liga match with the Catalans' main squad, pitching in at left back in a 1–3 away loss against Athletic Bilbao. He also played once in the club's Copa Catalunya win over RCD Espanyol in June 2007, under manager Frank Rijkaard.

Swansea City
In late September 2007, after an unsuccessful trial with Aris Thessaloniki FC, free agent Orlandi signed for Swansea City, moving to the Liberty Stadium on a one-year deal as the club was managed by his compatriot Roberto Martínez. In July 2010 he was linked to fellow Football League Championship side Leicester City, who had just appointed former Swans boss Paulo Sousa as their new coach, but nothing came of it, and the player renewed his link for a further two years, having done the same the year before.

On 4 July 2011, after having helped Swansea to its first-ever promotion to the Premier League, contributing 20 games to this feat, Orlandi penned a new one-year contract extension with the club. After signing, however, he found opportunities limited in Brendan Rodgers' first team and, on 2 January 2012, was offered to ADO Den Haag on a temporary basis alongside Thomas Butler and David Cotterill; both Butler and Cotterill were subsequently released from their contracts, with Orlandi opting to remain with the Welsh until the end of the season.

Orlandi scored the fastest Premier League goal in five years on 28 April 2012, with a diving header from a Scott Sinclair cross after just 25 seconds. Swansea drew the game 4–4 against Wolverhampton Wanderers, who had already been relegated.

Brighton & Hove Albion
Orlandi transferred to Brighton & Hove Albion on 31 August 2012, signing a two-year deal. He scored his first goal for his new team on 27 November, helping to a 2–0 home league win over Bristol City. His second came on 5 January 2013, in an eventual elimination of Newcastle United from the FA Cup (same result).

Appearances in the 2013–14 campaign were limited for Orlandi, and he was released at its closure. He subsequently stated his disappointment for leaving, mentioning his child had been born in Brighton.

Blackpool
On 1 August 2014, Orlandi agreed a one-year contract with the option of a further year with Blackpool also in the English second tier, after five days of talks. He was featured in a pre-season friendly against Burnley the following day, alongside eight other triallists; however, the deal was not made official until 8 August, ahead of the season opener against Nottingham Forest, and he made his competitive debut precisely in that match, starting and being booked in a 0–2 away loss.

Anorthosis
Orlandi joined Cypriot club Anorthosis Famagusta F.C. on 31 August 2015 on a one-year deal, with the option of a second year. He made his debut on 13 September, in a 3–0 home defeat of Ethnikos Achna FC for the Cypriot First Division.

APOEL
On 8 June 2016, Orlandi signed a one-year deal with reigning Cypriot champions APOEL FC. He made his competitive debut on 12 July, coming on as a 71st-minute substitute in a 0–0 away draw against The New Saints F.C. in the second qualifying round of the UEFA Champions League. He scored his first goal for his new team on 18 January 2017, netting the winner in a 2–1 home victory over Nea Salamis Famagusta FC in the domestic cup.

Orlandi's contract was terminated on 30 January 2017.

Later years
On 6 August 2018, Orlandi joined Indian Super League franchise Chennaiyin FC after a two-year stint with Novara Calcio in the Serie B. He returned to Italy in January 2019, signing with Serie C club Virtus Entella. The following month, however, he was diagnosed with a previously undetected cardiac pathology, and retired with immediate effect.

Club statistics

References

External links

1984 births
Living people
Spanish people of Italian descent
Footballers from Barcelona
Spanish footballers
Association football wingers
La Liga players
Segunda División players
Segunda División B players
CF Damm players
Deportivo Alavés B players
Deportivo Alavés players
FC Barcelona Atlètic players
FC Barcelona players
Premier League players
English Football League players
Swansea City A.F.C. players
Brighton & Hove Albion F.C. players
Blackpool F.C. players
Cypriot First Division players
Anorthosis Famagusta F.C. players
APOEL FC players
Serie B players
Novara F.C. players
Indian Super League players
Chennaiyin FC players
Virtus Entella players
Spanish expatriate footballers
Expatriate footballers in Wales
Expatriate footballers in England
Expatriate footballers in Cyprus
Expatriate footballers in Italy
Expatriate footballers in India
Spanish expatriate sportspeople in Wales
Spanish expatriate sportspeople in England
Spanish expatriate sportspeople in Cyprus
Spanish expatriate sportspeople in Italy
Spanish expatriate sportspeople in India
Sportspeople of Italian descent